The Vulture is a 1937 British quota quickie slapstick comedy film directed by Ralph Ince and starring Claude Hulbert, Hal Walters and Lesley Brook.  The film proved very popular with audiences and the following year spawned a sequel The Viper, although this was much less successful.

There is no indication of the film having been shown after its original cinema run. The British Film Institute do not hold a print in the BFI National Archive, although they do have a number of production stills on file.  Both The Vulture and The Viper are included on the BFI's "75 Most Wanted" list of missing British feature films.

Plot
Hopeless but eager would-be private detective Cedric Gull (Hulbert) has just obtained a diploma from a backstreet 'School of Detection' and is keen to put his new qualification to good use.  Fortuitously, he happens to stumble across a crime scene at the office of a diamond merchant, who has just been robbed and assaulted and is being tended by his secretary Sylvia (Brook).  The police arrive on the scene, but despite Cedric's proud boasts about his sleuthing qualifications, they decline his kind offers of help.

Striking out on his own, Cedric becomes convinced that the robbery was the work of a notorious gang of East End Chinese jewel thieves led by a mysterious and sinister individual known as The Vulture.  He takes on board his ex-con sidekick Stiffy (Walters) and the pair set off in pursuit of the criminals.  Their plans come unstuck when their inept bungling lands them both in prison.  However the police, aware of their interest in the case, agree to allow them out to act as decoys.  Cedric learns that Sylvia has been abducted by the criminals.  He decides to disguise himself as Chinese and try to infiltrate their hideout and rescue Sylvia.  After a good deal of hapless buffoonery and narrow escapes from sticky situations, he and Stiffy finally succeed in freeing Sylvia, unmasking the thieves and uncovering the identity of the elusive Vulture.

Cast
 Claude Hulbert as Cedric Gull
 Hal Walters as Stiffy Mason
 Lesley Brook as Sylvia
 George Merritt as Spicer
 Arthur Hardy as Li-Fu
 Frederick Burtwell as Jenkinson
 Archibald Batty as McBride
 George Carr as Charlie Yen

Reception
As well as turning out to be a box-office hit, The Vulture received a generally favourable reception from critics.  Kine Weekly noted: "The peculiar fecklessness of the star is well adapted to the super-inanity of the story, and the film, with its crazy humour and asinine 'hero' goes all out for the well-known Hulbert effects - and gets them", also praising "excellent production values".  The notoriously hard-to-please Monthly Film Bulletin was prepared to concede that it was "an amusing story...adequately directed and the fun well-timed" and that Hulbert "makes the most of his opportunities".

References

External links 
 BFI 75 Most Wanted entry, with extensive notes
 

1937 films
1937 comedy films
British slapstick comedy films
British black-and-white films
Films directed by Ralph Ince
Lost British films
1937 lost films
Lost comedy films
1930s British films